is a railway station in Daitō Town, Sasebo, Nagasaki Prefecture, Japan. It is operated by JR Kyushu and is on the Sasebo Line.

Lines
Besides the Sasebo Line local services, the JR Kyushu Rapid Seaside Liner also stops at the station. In addition, although  is the official starting point of the Ōmura Line, most of its local services run on to terminate at  using the Sasebo Line track and stop at this station on the way.

Station layout 
The station, which is unstaffed, consists of two staggered side platforms serving two tracks. There is no station building but shelters are provided on both platforms as well as automatic ticket vending machines. Access to the opposite side platform is by means of a level crossing with ramps at both ends.

Adjacent stations

History
Japanese Government Railways (JGR) opened the station on 30 September 1942 as Daitō Signal Box. On 15 May 1945, the facility was upgraded to a full station and passenger services commenced. With the privatization of Japanese National Railways (JNR), the successor of JGR, on 1 April 1987, control of the station passed to JR Kyushu.

Passenger statistics
In fiscal 2016, the station was used by an average of 523 passengers daily (boarding passengers only), and it ranked 242nd  among the busiest stations of JR Kyushu.

Environs
Nishi–Kyushu Expressway Sasebo–Daitō Interchange
National Route 35
National Route 205
ÆON Daitō Shopping Center

See also
 List of railway stations in Japan

References

External links

Daitō Station (JR Kyushu)
Daitō Station (Rome2Rio)

Railway stations in Nagasaki Prefecture
Railway stations in Japan opened in 1945
Sasebo Line
Sasebo